Aquiles Delle Vigne (January 3, 1946  -  January 21, 2022) was an Argentine pianist, born in Rosario. He won the Grand Prix "Alberto Williams", which lead him to an international career. Pupil of Claudio Arrau at the age of 17, in Europe Delle Vigne completed his studies with Eduardo del Pueyo and György Cziffra.

Claudio Arrau said about him:
"I consider Aquiles Delle Vigne as one of the most brilliant and remarkable pianists of his generation. His concerts and his records prove his great pianistic, artistic and teaching capability. He can be considered as one of the most important teachers today."
(New York) 

György Cziffra said about him: "Aquiles Delle Vigne possesses all the artistic and pedagogical qualities, allowing him to build successfully a career as a pianist and teacher. Dazzling performance in concert of Ravel's concerto for the left hand. Great Artist."  (Senlis, 31 May 1985)

Aquiles Delle Vigne has performed piano solo recitals in the most prestigious halls all around the world. He also appeared as a soloist with many major orchestras in collaboration with conductors such as Lord Yehudi Menuhin, Alberto Lysy, Georges Octors, Leopold Hager, Lee Dong-ho, etc.

Invited as a jury member for international piano competitions in Pretoria, Casagrande, Sydney, Cincinnati, Texas, Paris, etc., his career as a pianist was edged by a restless love for teaching. He gave master classes at the International Sommerakademie Universität Mozarteum in Salzburg, Tchaikovsky Moscow Conservatory, Korsakov Saint Petersburg Conservatory, National Taiwan Normal University in Taipei, Central and China Conservatories of Beijing, Toho University in Tokyo, Universities in Seoul, Royal Northern College of Music in Manchester, Hochschules in München, Karlsruhe and Hamburg, Juilliard School of Music, Manhattan School of Music, Hartt School of Music, etc.

Aquiles Delle Vigne has recorded for EMI His Master's Voice, Naxos, BMG-RCA Victor, BASF Harmonia Mundi, Pavane and EMS. His complete recording of Franz Liszt's 12 Etudes d'execution transcendante has been reviewed as "probably the best interpretation of these etudes since Arrau" His most recent recording features Ludwig van Beethoven's complete Piano Sonatas.

External links 
  Aquiles Delle Vigne - Official Website

References 

Argentine classical pianists
Living people
21st-century classical pianists
1946 births